Janko Božović (born 14 July 1985) is an Austrian handball player for Al-Sulaibikhat and the Austrian national team.

He is the son of former Austrian handballplayer Stanka Bozovic.

References

External links

1985 births
Living people
Austrian male handball players
People from Bar, Montenegro
Montenegrin male handball players
Expatriate handball players
Handball-Bundesliga players
Füchse Berlin Reinickendorf HBC players
Sporting CP handball players
VfL Gummersbach players